Helena of Serbia (b. after 1109 – after 1146) was Queen of Hungary as the wife of King Béla II. After her husband's death, she governed Hungary as regent from 1141 to September 1146 together with her brother, Beloš, during the minority of her eldest son, Géza II, came of age. 

A daughter of Prince Uroš I of Serbia (r. ca. 1112–1145), she was arranged to marry Béla II in 1129 by his cousin, King Stephen II (r. 1116–1131). Her younger sons, Ladislaus II and Stephen IV, also ruled as kings of Hungary. She had two other brothers Uroš II and Desa besides Beloš.

Life

Early life
Helena was the daughter of Serbian Grand Prince Uroš I (r. ca. 1112–1145) of the Vukanović dynasty, and Byzantine princess Anna Diogene. Her father had participated in the Byzantine-Hungarian War (1127–29), on the side of King Stephen II of Hungary. The Hungarian Army had destroyed Byzantine Belgrade and penetrated to Naissos (Niš), Serdica (Sofia) and Philippopolis (Plovdiv).

Around 1129, King Stephen II arranged her marriage with his cousin Béla, who had been blinded on the order of the king's father, King Coloman of Hungary (r. 1095–1116). Béla and his father Almos were blinded, so that they will be removed from the line of succession. However, King Stephen was childless and decided to recognise Béla as his successor. Uroš I had prior to this suffered to both Hungary and Byzantium, so he happily befriended the Hungarian king. King Stephen II granted estates near Tolna to the newly wed couple.

Queen consort
 
Following the childless king's death, her husband was crowned King of Hungary on 28 April 1131. Queen Helena had great influence on her husband, and the Hungarian state. They had six children: Géza II, Ladislaus II, Stephen IV, Álmos, Sophia and Elisabeth or Gertrud. She was to great help to her husband and governed the state during his rule. She was loyal to her husband and state, and it was she who persuaded the nobles at an assembly in Arad to execute 68 Hungarian aristocrats who had plotted with King Coloman to blind her husband. According to contemporary sources she was attending the execution with her son Bela, in order to secure the death of her husband's enemies.

She settled Serbs in Csepel Island, and Ráckeve, where she built a monastery and church which exist still today.

Regency
When her husband died on 13 February 1141, their eldest son Géza II was still a child, therefore Helena and her brother Beloš Vukanović governed the Kingdom of Hungary until September 1146 when Géza II came of age. Beloš was Palatine of Hungary, the highest-ranking official, from 1141 to 1161, and Ban of Slavonia from 1146 to 1157. Helena continued to hold great influence on the rule and with the help of her brother Hungary had good relations and peace on its southern borders. In the period of Bela's death, the German-Hungarian relations had been shattered and the engagement of Henric and Sophia, Helena's daughter, was canceled. Sophia took monastic vows and became an abbess at Admont, in Styria.

Rule of Géza II and aftermath
During the rule of Géza II, Stephen IV and Ladislaus II were not satisfied with their titles and possessions, so they sought help with the Holy Roman Emperors and Byzantine Emperors. The plots against Géza II had no success, and after his death (1161) Manuel I Komnenos saw a good opportunity to expand Byzantine influence in Hungary. Manuel helped to dethrone Stephen III, son of Géza II, and place firstly Ladislaus II and then Stephen IV for a short time. Finally, Stephen III secured the throne in 1163. Queen Helena is believed to have died in 1161.

Marriage and children

# c. 1129: King Béla II of Hungary (c. 1110 –  13 February 1141)
 Elisabeth or Gertrud (c. 1129 – before 1155), wife of duke Mieszko III of Poland
 King Géza II of Hungary (c. 1130 – 3 May 1162)
 King Ladislaus II of Hungary (1131 – 14 January 1163)
 King Stephen IV of Hungary (c. 1133 – 11 April 1165)
 Álmos (?)
 Sophia (c. 1136 – ?), nun at Admont (Styria)

References

Sources

12th-century monarchs in Europe
12th-century women rulers
12th-century viceregal rulers
12th-century Hungarian people
12th-century Serbian royalty
Converts to Roman Catholicism from Eastern Orthodoxy
Hungarian queens consort
Medieval Serbian princesses
Hungarian Roman Catholics
Hungarian people of Serbian descent
Medieval Hungarian people of Serbian descent
Burials at the Basilica of the Assumption of the Blessed Virgin Mary
Burials at St. Michael's Cathedral, Alba Iulia
Year of birth uncertain
1161 deaths
12th-century Hungarian women
12th-century Serbian people
12th-century Serbian women
Serbian Roman Catholics
Queen mothers